Marc van Eijk (born 5 November 1981) in Paramaribo is a retired Surinamese football player and manager. He is currently coach for the CRKSV Jong Holland in Curaçao.

Club career
Once hailed as a big talent, Van Eijk came through the Heerenveen youth system to makes his professional debut for them in a February 1999 Eredivisie match against Willem II. After a season on loan at Eerste Divisie side Veendam he moved abroad to play for Greek outfit Doxa Drama in summer 2014.

He returned to Holland in February 2005 to train with SC Cambuur after claiming the Greek club owed him salary. He ended up playing amateur football in Holland with Omniworld, MSC and Alcides among others, and was coach of amateurs Broekster Boys before moving to Curacao.

References

External links
 

1981 births
Living people
Sportspeople from Paramaribo
Association football forwards
Surinamese footballers
Surinamese football managers
Dutch footballers
Dutch football managers
Surinamese emigrants to the Netherlands
SC Heerenveen players
SC Veendam players
Eredivisie players
Eerste Divisie players
Sekshon Pagá managers
C.V.V. Inter Willemstad players